Carrias is a municipality located in the province of Burgos, Castile and León, Spain. According to the 2013 census (INE), the municipality has a population of 26 inhabitants.

References

External links
La web de la capital de "Las Lomas" Blog about Carrias 

Municipalities in the Province of Burgos